William Joseph Winter (born May 20, 1930) is an American prelate of the Roman Catholic Church who served as an auxiliary bishop of the Diocese of Pittsburgh in Pennsylvania from 1988 to 2005.

Biography

Early life 
Winter was born on 20, 1930, in the Beechview section of Pittsburgh. He attended St. Catherine of Siena (Beechview) for grade school, and St. Michael High School in Pittsburgh's South Side before entering St. Vincent Seminary in Unity Township, Pennsylvania in 1948.

Priesthood 
Winter was ordained a priest by Archbishop Martin John O’Connor for the Diocese of Pittsburgh on December 17, 1955. After his ordination, Winter briefly served as an assistant pastor at St. Bernard Parish in Mount Lebanon, Pennsylvania.  He then travelled to Rome to study at the Pontifical Gregorian University, receiving a degree in sacred theology in 1958. After returning to Pittsburgh, Winter was assigned as the pastor of Holy Innocents Parish in Sheraden, Pennsylvania, and then St. Philip's Parish in Crafton, Pennsylvania. He also served as assistant chancellor and vice-chancellor of the diocese.

Auxiliary Bishop of Pittsburgh 
Winter was appointed as auxiliary bishop of the Diocese of Pittsburgh on December 21, 1988 by Pope John Paul II.  He was consecrated on February 13, 1989, by then Archbishop Donald Wuerl. While auxiliary bishop, Winter also served as pastor of Sacred Heart Parish in the Shadyside section of Pittsburgh. He led the Parish Reorganization and Revitalization Project that dissolved or consolidated 163 parishes in the diocese between 1992 and 1994.

Retirement 
Winter submitted his letter of resignation as auxiliary bishop of the Diocese of Pittsburgh when he reached the mandatory retirement age for bishops of 75. It was accepted by Pope John Paul II on May 20, 2005. At the time of his resignation, Winter was recognized by the Pittsburgh Post-Gazette for confirming an estimated 45,000 Catholics. Since he resigned, Winter has resided at St. John Vianney Manor Retirement Home on the campus of St. Paul Seminary in Crafton, Pennsylvania.

See also
 

 Catholic Church hierarchy
 Catholic Church in the United States
 Historical list of the Catholic bishops of the United States
 List of Catholic bishops of the United States
 Lists of patriarchs, archbishops, and bishops

References

External links
Roman Catholic Diocese of Pittsburgh Official Site

Episcopal succession

1930 births
Living people
20th-century American Roman Catholic titular bishops
21st-century American Roman Catholic titular bishops
Religious leaders from Pittsburgh
Saint Vincent College alumni